Humphrey William Dolman (30 August 1906 — 1964) was an English footballer who played as a goalkeeper.

Career
Dolman began his career in 1925, playing for Blakenhall Congregationals. A year later, Dolman signed for hometown club Bloxwich, before joining Willenhall a year later. In February 1929, Dolman signed for Football League club Chesterfield. In the 1930–31 season, Dolman played every game for Chesterfield as the club won the Third Division North. In 1933, Dolman left Chesterfield following the signing of Jack Moody, signing for Bristol City. Dolman played for Bristol City for three years, signing for Luton Town in 1936, helping the club win the 1936–37 Third Division South. Dolman lost his place in the Luton line-up in November 1938, signing for Chelmsford City briefly in March 1939, before the outbreak of World War II.

References

Year of birth missing
Date of death missing
Year of death missing
Association football goalkeepers
English footballers
People from Bloxwich
Willenhall F.C. players
Chesterfield F.C. players
Bristol City F.C. players
Luton Town F.C. players
Chelmsford City F.C. players
English Football League players